An Oppidan Scholar is a boy at Eton College who has distinguished himself academically.

Features
Oppidan scholarships are honorary awards which provide no financial benefit.

Oppidan Scholars have the letters "OS" written after their surname in school lists.

Etymology
The expression Oppidan Scholar derives from the Latin word oppidum meaning ‘town’.

Award of title
Oppidan Scholarships are currently awarded based upon receiving Distinction in a certain number of Trials (the internal examinations held twice a year): a boy will be considered for the scholarship after receiving four Distinctions (or three consecutively). Since 2018, Oppidan Scholarships have not been awarded on entry on the basis of the King’s Scholarship examination.

References

Eton College